The 2021 Conference USA women's basketball tournament was a postseason women's basketball tournament for Conference USA that was held at The Ford Center at The Star in Frisco, Texas, from March 10 through March 13, 2021. Middle Tennessee won the tournament, its 17th title, earning a bid to the NCAA tournament.

Seeds
All 14 teams will qualify for the tournament. Teams will be seeded by record within their respective conference divisions, however the tournament will blend the divisional seed opponents in each round.

Schedule

Bracket

* denotes overtime

See also
2021 Conference USA men's basketball tournament

References

Conference USA women's basketball tournament
Sports in Frisco, Texas
2020–21 Conference USA women's basketball season
Conference USA women's basketball